Govind Prasad Lohani (1927 – 26 December 2020) was a Royal Nepalese Ambassador to Pakistan, Iran and Turkey. He was well regarded in Nepal as a senior economist and political advisor. He was a son of famous Nepali poet Deepkeshwar Sharma. He wrote more than 20 books relating to communism, civilization and economics. He served as a member of planning commission of Nepal during King Birendra's regime and was a founding member of Nepal Rastriya Bank, the central bank of Nepal.

References

Nepalese diplomats
1927 births
2020 deaths
Ambassadors of Nepal to Pakistan
Ambassadors of Nepal to Iran
Ambassadors of Nepal to Turkey